Pédernec is a commune in the Côtes-d'Armor department of Brittany in northwestern France.

Population

Inhabitants of Pédernec are called pédernécois in French.

Sights
 Manoir de Kermataman - 16th century manor-house with Gothic and Renaissance façades.

See also
Communes of the Côtes-d'Armor department

References

External links

Communes of Côtes-d'Armor